Konstantin Konstantinovich Provalov (30 September 1949 – 9 April 2021) was a Soviet and Russian diplomat. He served in various diplomatic roles from 1973 onwards, and was Ambassador of Russia to Estonia between 2000 and 2006.

Career
Provalov was born on 30 September 1949 in Moscow, then part of the Russian Soviet Federative Socialist Republic, in the Soviet Union. He studied at Moscow State Institute of International Relations, graduating in 1972 with a degree in International Relations, and entered diplomatic service. In addition to his native Russian, he spoke Bengali and English. Provalov's early service was spent holding various diplomatic posts in the Soviet, and later the Russian Ministry of Foreign Affairs, and in the department's foreign missions and embassies abroad. His first posting, in 1972, was as an assistant in the Ministry's South Asia Department, and was followed by postings to Bangladesh and Myanmar. He also spent an extended period in the apparatus of the Central Committee of the Communist Party of the Soviet Union.

In 1996 Provalov became deputy director of the department of the Executive Secretariat, and deputy executive secretary of the Foreign Ministry. He held the position until April 1999, when he became deputy director of General Secretariat, and deputy secretary general of the Foreign Ministry. He had been appointed to the diplomatic rank of Envoy Extraordinary and Plenipotentiary Second Class on 9 July 1998. During this time he studied at Diplomatic Academy of the Ministry of Foreign Affairs of the Russian Federation, graduating from its Higher Diplomatic Courses in 2000.

On 15 September 2000 Provalov was appointed Russian ambassador to Estonia, holding the post until 25 July 2006. On his recall, he became director of the Ministry's Historical and Documentary Department, during which time he was promoted to Envoy Extraordinary and Plenipotentiary First Class on 28 November 2007. He remained with the Historical Department until 2012, when he was appointed Russia's consul general in Karlovy Vary, in the Czech Republic. This was his last foreign posting, which he held until 2015.

Provalov died on 9 April 2021. He was also awarded the Order of the Cross of Terra Mariana First Class by Estonia, announced on 18 August 2006 and presented on 22 August 2006. His obituary by the Russian Ministry of Foreign Affairs described him as "distinguished by diligence, dedication, a responsible approach to business, and an attentive attitude towards others."

References 

1949 births
2021 deaths
Diplomats from Moscow
Ambassadors of Russia to Estonia
Moscow State Institute of International Relations alumni
Diplomatic Academy of the Ministry of Foreign Affairs of the Russian Federation alumni
Recipients of the Order of the Cross of Terra Mariana, 1st Class